Muddathir Abdel-Rahim ( Muddathir ʿAbd Al-Rahim; born in Ad-Damar, Sudan in 1932) is professor of political science in International University of Africa.

Career 
He taught in Malaysia where he was Distinguished Professor and Head of the Human Rights Programme at the Islamic University Malaysia (UIM) from 2013 to 2016.
He was Professor of Political Science and Islamic Studies and Very Distinguished Academic Fellow at ISTAC from 1997 to 2013. He had earlier taught in universities around the world – including University of Manchester, Temple University, Northern Illinois University, Mohammed V University, Makerere University, Bayero University Kano, and University of Khartoum.
He commenced teaching Political Science at the University of Khartoum in July 1958 and became the founding Head of the Department of Political Science at the University in the sixties.

He has also been Ambassador to Sweden, Norway, Denmark, and Finland, 1974 – 1975; UNESCO Senior Expert in Social Sciences in charge of Research and Human Resource Development Programme, CAFRAD, in Tangier, Morocco, from 1971 to 1973; and Vice Chancellor of Omdurman Islamic University from 1988 to 1991 where he established faculties of Medicine, Engineering, and Agriculture.

As a delegate to the UN General Assembly sessions in the sixties, he participated in the debates that led to the adoption of the International Convention on the Elimination of All Forms of Racial Discrimination 1965, the International Covenant on Economic, Social and Cultural Rights 1966, and the International Covenant on Civil and Political Rights 1966.  In 1967, he participated in drafting UNESCO’s Third Statement on Race and Racial Prejudice.

He was also founding member and Secretary General of the Sudanese National Committee for Human Rights which was established in Khartoum in 1967 – evidently the first of its kind in the Muslim world.

Muddathir was awarded the Jordanian Royal Medal for Distinguished Contributions in August 2013.

He was honored as "Personality of the Year" in the Sudan by the Ministry of Culture on 18 October 2019 for his academic and cultural contributions, especially in connection with the promotion of Human Rights.

Publications
Abdel-Rahim's publications include

 Imperialism and Nationalism in the Sudan.
 Human Rights in Theory and Practice (Dar al-Fikr, Beirut, 1968).
 The Human Rights Tradition in Islam (volume three in the Human Rights And The World's Major Religions.
 Islam in the Sudan (Dar al-Asala, Cairo, 1998).
 Islam in Africa (Dar al-Fikr, Damascus, 2001).
 al-Ghazzali's Political Thought: Its Nature and Contemporary Significance and Other Essays on Hujjatul Islam (IIUM, Malaysia, 2011).

Excerpts from reviews of some of the above-mentioned books:

1. Writing about The Human Rights Tradition in Islam (in the Muslim World Book Review 2008), Dr. Murad Wilfried Hofmann had the following to say
"... Dr. Abdel-Rahim is eminently suited for presenting this subject, given his first hand knowledge of both East and West and his previous diplomatic career at the UN in New York and UNESCO in Paris as well as Scandinavia...
Usually Muslim publications on human rights simply claim that Islam has invented the whole category and that there is no deficit in practicing these rights. Ducking all the issues, this prototypical apologetic literature in point is utterly useless and even harmful. So much welcome is the publication under review because the author is as learned as he is realistic and frank... I found chapter 3, which is devoted to the Interplay of Theory and Practice: Questions of Gender and Minorities, most impressive ..."
2. On Imperialism and Nationalism in the Sudan,

"The best work on the development of Sudanese nationalism yet published," Richard Hill in AFRICA

"This is an important contribution, not only to the history of the Sudan, but also to the whole struggle between European Imperialism and the nationalism it begot in Africa and Asia." THE ECONOMIST.

"A solid contribution to the political history and constitutional development of the Sudan," Robert Tignor in THE MIDDLE EAST JOURNAL

"... An interesting and detailed account of the Sudanese body politic... (which) makes breathtaking between the lines reading ... this outstanding scholar ... this well balanced and lucid study." BIBLIOTHECA ORIENTALIS

"A concise and pivotal study of the constitutional development of the Sudan..." Robert Collins in THE JOURNAL OF AFRICAN HISTORY

"... Throws fresh light on many important issues and its publication ... will be welcome to both the specialist and the general reader ... a readable, comprehensive piece of scholarship based mainly on unpublished sources ... carefully researched and clearly presented." ARCHIVE ORIENTALI

"While Sudanese constitutional history has been described in a number of works, most of these studies have been written by British or Egyptian scholars and officials who have concentrated on explaining (and justifying) the policies of their countries. Muddathir Abdel-Rahim provides a detailed and balanced scholarly account from the Sudanese perspective ... The book is obviously essential for understanding modern Sudanese history and should be of real importance to students of British Middle Eastern policy and those interested in the growth of nationalism in colonial areas." John Voll in THE INTERNATIONAL JOURNAL OF MIDDLE EAST STUDIES.

In addition, he has also published a number of articles in learned journals in Arabic and English. Several of his works have been translated to other languages.

References

1932 births
Sudanese human rights activists
People from River Nile (state)
Temple University faculty
Northern Illinois University faculty
Academic staff of Makerere University
Academic staff of Bayero University Kano
Academic staff of the University of Khartoum
Omdurman Islamic University
Living people
Sudanese expatriates in Malaysia
Sudanese expatriates in Nigeria
Sudanese expatriates in the United States
Sudanese expatriates in the United Kingdom
Sudanese expatriates in Uganda
Sudanese expatriates in Morocco